In June 2012, Wales toured Australia as part of the 2012 mid-year rugby test series. They faced Australia in a series of three internationals across the eastern states, starting at Suncorp Stadium in Brisbane, then moving on to Etihad Stadium in Melbourne, before finishing in Sydney at the Sydney Football Stadium. In addition, they played a tour match against one of Australia's domestic clubs, the Brumbies, at Canberra Stadium.

Before flying to Australia, Wales also held a one-off match at home so that Rob Howley, the caretaker coach, could finalise the squad. This was held at the Millennium Stadium in Cardiff against the Barbarians.

During this tour, Wales were attempting to regain the James Bevan Trophy they lost in 2009, when Australia beat them 33–12 in Cardiff. They had won it the previous year, 21–18. However, the last time Wales beat Australia in Australia was in 1969, when they won 19–16.

This tour was the most keenly anticipated rugby tour of the 2012 tours, with Wales going into it as Grand Slam winners of the 2012 Six Nations and Australia as winners of the 2011 Tri Nations.

Wales lost the series 3–0, continuing their history of not having won in Australia for 43 years. However, all matches were close encounters, and they scored 61 points to Australia's 72. They also played a return match in Cardiff in the 2012 Autumn Internationals that ended in a similar narrow defeat, 14–12.

In the last three matches between the two teams, Wales led with five minutes to go and Australia snatched victory from them.

Fixtures

Squads

Wales
Towards the end of May, the bulk of the Welsh squad left for Australia, leaving a handful of players to face the Barbarians. After Wales' win over the Barbarians, the few players who had earned their place in the squad during the game left for Australia to join up with the team. Caretaker coach Rob Howley announced a 35-man squad to take to Australia.

Caretaker coach:  Rob Howley

Australia
Robbie Deans announced his squad to face Wales at the beginning of June. The public already knew that James O'Connor, Kurtley Beale and usual captain James Horwill would all be out of the tour due to injury. From this, Robbie Deans was able to announce his 40-man squad. On 19 June, it was revealed that Beale would return for the third and final test against Wales.

Head coach:  Robbie Deans

Warm-up matches

Wales vs Barbarians

 The Welsh Rugby Union announced that this would be a fully capped match. As a result, Martyn Williams became the third Welsh player to reach 100 caps when he came off the bench. It was also announced that this match would see the last international appearances for Martyn Williams and Wales top try-scorer Shane Williams.
 Four players made their full international debuts for Wales: Rhodri Jones, Harry Robinson, Liam Williams and Adam Warren.

ACT Brumbies vs Wales

Test matches

First test

Notes
Cooper Vuna (Australia) and Ashley Beck (Wales) made their international debuts.

Second test

Third test

See also
 2012 mid-year rugby test series
 2012 France rugby union tour of Argentina
 2012 Scotland rugby union tour of Australia, Fiji and Samoa
 2012 Ireland rugby union tour of New Zealand
 2012 England rugby union tour of South Africa

References

2012 in Australian rugby union
2011–12 in Welsh rugby union
2012
2012
History of rugby union matches between Australia and Wales